Ernest Harvey Bromley (2 September 1912 – 1 February 1967) was an Australian cricketer who played in two Test matches, one in 1933 and the other in 1934.

He was educated at Christian Brothers College, Perth (now Aquinas College), where he left in 1928 to play first-class cricket for Western Australia, and in 1933 became the first Western Australian to play cricket for Australia.

References

1912 births
1967 deaths
Australia Test cricketers
Australian cricketers
Cricketers from Fremantle
Europeans cricketers
People educated at Christian Brothers' College, Perth
Victoria cricketers
Western Australia cricketers